Gopalakrishnan, Gopalkrishnan, Gopalakrishna, and Gopalkrishna refer to Gopal (Krishna) and are used as both a given and a surname in India.

People named Gopalakrishnan
Adoor Gopalakrishnan (born 1941), also known as Moutatthu Gopalakrishnan Unnithan, Indian film director, script writer, and producer
A. P. M. Gopalakrishnan (born 1947), Indian cricketer
M. S. Gopalakrishnan (1931–2013), Indian classical music violin exponent
Omana and Moscow Gopalakrishnan, husband-and-wife duo noted for their translation of Russian books into Malayalam
Omana Gopalakrishnan (died 2003) 
Moscow Gopalakrishnan (1931–2011)
Suresh Gopalakrishnan, American engineer
T. V. Gopalakrishnan, Chennai-based musician

People named Gopalakrishna
 Gopalakrishna Adiga, a Kannada poet
 Gopalakrishna Bharati, a 19th-century Tamil poet and composer

People named Gopalkrishna
 Gopalkrishna Gandhi, an Indian diplomat and a grandson of Mahatma Gandhi

See also
 All pages with Gopalakrishnan in the title
 All pages with Gopalkrishnan in the title
 All pages with Gopalakrishna in the title
 All pages with Gopalkrishna in the title